Amin Nasir ( – 16 January 2017) was a Singaporean football player and manager. He played as a defender for sides including Sembawang Rangers and Woodlands Wellington. He managed the S.League side Hougang United from 2013 to 2014. He also represented the Singapore national football team and was awarded a bronze medal at the 1993 Southeast Asian Games. His brother, Nazri, captained the Singapore national team from 1997 to 2003.

Amin was first diagnosed with colon cancer in 2012. He died at Khoo Teck Puat Hospital on 16 January 2017 at the age of 48, more than four years after his original diagnosis. He was survived by his wife and two children.

References

External links
 

1960s births
2017 deaths
Singaporean footballers
Association football defenders
Deaths from cancer in Singapore
Deaths from colorectal cancer
Hougang United FC head coaches
Singapore Premier League head coaches
Sembawang Rangers FC players
Singaporean football managers
Singapore international footballers
Singaporean people of Malay descent
Woodlands Wellington FC players
Southeast Asian Games bronze medalists for Singapore
Southeast Asian Games medalists in football
Competitors at the 1993 Southeast Asian Games